Southport power station supplied electricity to the town of Southport and the surrounding area from 1894 to the late 1960s. The power station was built by the Southport Corporation which operated it up to the nationalisation of the British electricity supply industry in 1948. Birkdale power station was operated by the Birkdale District Electric Supply Company Limited and originally supplied Birkdale Urban District until the district was incorporated into the Borough of Southport in 1911.

History
Southport Corporation applied in 1891 for a Provisional Order under the Electric Lighting Acts  to generate and supply electricity to the town of Southport. An Order was granted by the Board of Trade and was confirmed by Parliament through the Electric Lighting Orders Confirmation (No. 2) Act 1891 (54 & 55 Vict. c. l). A power station was built in Russell Road, Southport (53°38’41”N, 2°57’49”W) and was commissioned in 1894. The Corporation charged 7d./kWh and had 338 customers in 1897.

Provisional Orders were granted in 1883 and 1898 to Birkdale District Electric Supply Company Limited to supply electricity to Birkdale. The company built a power station Grantham Road, Birkdale. Birkdale Urban District was incorporated into the borough of Southport in 1911, after which Birkdale power station was operated by Southport Corporation.

Southport Corporation Tramways operated a tramway service in Southport between 1900 and 1934, this was supplied with electric current by the Southport and Birkdale power stations.

The generating station at Southport was extended with new plant as demand for electricity grew.

There was a legal case in 1925–26 concerning certain clauses in agreements between the Southport Corporation and the Birkdale Electric Company regarding electricity supplies.

The Central Electricity Board built the first stages of the National Grid between 1927 and 1933. Southport power station was connected to an electricity grid ring which included the power stations at Ribble (Lancaster), Lister Drive (Liverpool), Warrington and Westwood (Wigan); this was one of three electricity rings in the North West. The others were Bolton, Padiham, Rawtenstall and Kearsley power stations ring; and the third was Manchester, Oldham, Tame Valley and Stockport ring.

The British electricity supply industry was nationalised in 1948 under the provisions of the Electricity Act 1947 (10 & 11 Geo. 6 c. 54). The Southport electricity undertaking was abolished, ownership of Southport and Birkdale power stations were vested in the British Electricity Authority, and subsequently the Central Electricity Authority and the Central Electricity Generating Board (CEGB). At the same time the electricity distribution and sales responsibilities of the Southport electricity undertaking were transferred to the North Western Electricity Board (NORWEB).

Following nationalisation Southport power station became part of the Southport electricity supply district.

Southport power station was closed in the late 1960s.

Equipment specification
The plant in the original 1894 Southport power station was rated at 675 kW and comprised horizontal engines coupled by ropes and directly to Edison-Hopkinson and Ferranti dynamos.

Plant in 1923
By 1923 the plant at Southport comprised boilers delivering 57,000 lb/h (7.2 kg/s) of steam to:

 2 × 3,000 kW steam turbo-alternator (alternating current, AC).

The following electricity supplies were available to consumers:

 380 & 190 Volts, 3-phase, 50 Hz AC
 220 & 110 Volts, 1-phase, 50 Hz AC
 500 Volts DC
In 1923 the plant at Birkdale comprised boilers delivering 20,600 lb/h (26.0 kg/s) of steam to:

 1 × 350 kW reciprocating engine driving direct current (DC) generator
 3 × 110 kW reciprocating engines driving direct current (DC) generators

There was also a 90 kW oil fuelled engine

The following electricity supplies were available to consumers:

 550 Volts DC traction
 460  & 230 Volt DC

Plant in 1954
By 1954 the plant at Southport comprised:

 Boilers:
 2 × Vickers-Spearing 43,000 lb/h (5.4 kg/s) boilers
 1 × Vickers-Spearing 48,000 lb/h (6.05 kg/s) boiler
 1 × Yarrow 85,000 lb/h (10.71 kg/s) oil-fired boiler (commissioned October 1954)

Total evaporative capacity 219,000 lb/h (2706 kg/s), steam conditions were 260 psi and 720 °F (17.9 bar and 382 °C), steam was supplied to:

 Generators:
 1 × 7.7 MW Brush Ljungstrom turbo-alternator
 2 × 3.85 MW Brush Ljungstrom turbo-alternators
 1 × 1.85 MW Brush Ljungstrom turbo-alternator

The total installed capacity was 17.25 MW, 6.6 kV.

Condenser water was cooled by 2 × 0.15 million gallons per hour (682 m3/h) Peter Brotherhood cooling towers and 1 × 0.3 million gallons per hour (1364 m3/h ) induced draft cooling tower (commissioned December 1954) Water was supplied from land drainage works.

In 1954 the plant at Birkdale comprised a single 500 kW Fullagar diesel-English Electric set, generating 480 V DC.

Operations
In 1897 Southport power station sold 376,490 kWh of electricity, the maximum load was 404 kW.

Operating data 1921–23
The electricity supply data for the period 1921–23 was:

Electricity Loads on the system were:

Revenue from the sale of current (in 1923) was £73,491; the surplus of revenue over expenses was £46,345.

The electricity supply data for Birkdale in the period 1921–23 was:

Electricity Loads on the system were:

Revenue from the sale of current (in 1923) was £16,370; the surplus of revenue over expenses was £9,228.

Operating data 1946
In 1946 Southport power station supplied 22,877 MWh of electricity; the maximum output load was 11,124 kW. The load factor was 24.7%, and the thermal efficiency was 15.20%.

Birkdale power station was both steam powered and had oil engines, it sent out 242 MWh in 1946 and the maximum load was 1,052 MW.

Operating data 1954–67
Operating data for the period 1954–67 was:

The total output, in MWh, from Southport and Birkdale power stations is as shown.

Southport Electricity District
Following nationalisation in 1948 Southport power station became part of the Southport electricity supply district, covering 26 square miles (67.3 km2) with a population of 92,000 in 1958. The number of consumers and electricity sold in the Southport district was:

In 1958 the number of units sold to categories of consumers was:

The maximum demand on the system was 35,900 kW, the load factor was 31.7%.

See also
 Timeline of the UK electricity supply industry
 List of power stations in England

References

Demolished power stations in the United Kingdom
Coal-fired power stations in England